The women's sprint at the 2008 Summer Olympics took place on August 19 at the Laoshan Velodrome.

This track cycling event consisted of numerous rounds. The competition began with a time trial over 200 metres. The top 12 cyclists in that qualifying round were seeded into the 1/8 finals. There, they raced one-on-one. The six winners advanced to the quarterfinals, with the six losers getting another chance at the repechage. This repechage consisted of three-cyclist heats, with the two winners moving on to the quarterfinals.

Beginning with the quarterfinals, the head-to-head competitions switched to a best-of-three format. That format was also used for the semifinals and final. In addition, the bronze medal competition was a best-of-three match between the semifinal losers. The classification race for 5th to 8th places was a single race with all four cyclists competing.

Preliminaries
 200 metre time trial. All twelve cyclists advanced to the first round; the preliminary was purely for seeding.

First round
 The twelve cyclists were paired based on their preliminary round rankings, 1 vs. 12, 2 vs. 11, and so on, in head-to-head 200 metre matches, with the winners advancing to the second round and the losers to the repechage.

Match 1

Match 2

Match 3

Match 4

Match 5

Match 6

Repechage
 The sixlosers from the first round were put into two three-rider 200 metre matches, with the winner of each advancing to the next round.

Match 1

Match 2

Quarterfinals
 The eight cyclists qualified this far were paired for a best two-out-of-three series of 200 metre races. None of the pairings required a third race.

Match 1

Match 2

Match 3

Match 4

Semifinals
 The four cyclists qualified this far were paired again for a best two-out-of-three series of 200 metre races. Guo Shuang was relegated for having deemed to have illegally manoeuvred Anna Meares, after having jostled her in their third and decisive sprint.

Match 1

Match 2

9th—12th place classification race
 During the same session as the semifinals, the four cyclists who were eliminated in the repechage were put into a single four-rider 200 metre race to determine exact placings from ninth to twelfth.

Classification race

Finals

5th—8th place classification race
 In the same session as the finals, the four cyclists who lost in the quarterfinals were put into one four-rider 200 metre race to determine exact placings from fifth to eighth.

Classification race

 The winners from the semifinals were paired to race for gold and silver, and the losers from that round raced for bronze. Each match was again the best two-out-of-three 200 metre races.

Bronze medal match

Gold medal match

References

Track cycling at the 2008 Summer Olympics
Cycling at the Summer Olympics – Women's sprint
Olymp
Women's events at the 2008 Summer Olympics